Wijck is a Dutch surname derived from the Dutch word for neighborhood, "wijk".

Wijk in turn is derived from the Latin word "vicus". A vicus was a small settlement that started to emerge next to Roman forts, when local people wanted to trade with the Romans. Vicus became vic / wic / vyc / wyc / wik / wick / wich / wyk / wyck / wych, which became wijk or wijck. The sound of the "i" changed from sounding like "leek" or "weak", but somewhat shorter (vicus » vic), towards sounding like "strike" or "Mike" (wijck).

Notable people with the surname include:

C.C. van Asch van Wijck (1900–1932), Dutch artist, model and sculptor
Jaak van Wijck (1870–1946), notable Dutch painter
Johan Cornelis van der Wijck (1848–1919), Dutch lieutenant general of the Royal Netherlands East Indies Army
Robert Anderson Van Wyck (1849–1918), Mayor of New York
Thomas Wijck (1616–1677), Dutch painter, a member of Dutch family of painters and draughtsmen
Titus van Asch van Wijck (1849–1902), Dutch nobleman, politician and colonial governor of Suriname

See also
Van Asch Van Wijck Mountains, a mountain range in Suriname
Tenggelamnya Kapal van der Wijck (Sinking of the van der Wijck), an Indonesian serial and later novel
WJCK (disambiguation)
Wijk (disambiguation)
Van Wyck (disambiguation)